Bibiano Ouano (1915 – 1960) was a Filipino basketball player. He competed in the men's tournament at the 1936 Summer Olympics. He was a native of Cebu.

References

External links
 

1915 births
1960 deaths
Basketball players from Cebu
Philippines men's national basketball team players
Filipino men's basketball players
Olympic basketball players of the Philippines
Basketball players at the 1936 Summer Olympics
Place of birth missing
Letran Knights basketball players